Pitcairnia brongniartiana is a species of flowering plant in the Bromeliaceae family. It is native to Ecuador.

Cultivars
 Pitcairnia 'Stardust'

References

BSI Cultivar Registry Retrieved 11 October 2009

brongniartiana
Flora of Ecuador
Taxa named by Édouard André